"Judgement Day" is Ms Dynamite's first single from her second album, Judgement Days. "Judgement Day" was released on 26 September 2005 as a double A-side single with "Father". It reached number 25 in the UK Singles Chart in 2005.

Formats and track listings
CD single
 "Judgement Day" - 4:23
 "Father" - 3:56

Digital download
 "Judgement Day" - 4:23
 "Father" - 3:56
 "Self Destruct" - 4:49

Credits and personnel
Lead vocals – Ms. Dynamite
Producers – Chink Santana
Lyrics – Chink Santana, Niomi McLean-Daley
Label: Polydor Records

Charts performance

Release history

References

External links

Ms. Dynamite songs
2005 singles
Songs written by Ms. Dynamite
2005 songs
Polydor Records singles
Songs written by Chink Santana